The Nuchatlaht First Nation is a First Nations government based on the west coast of Vancouver Island in British Columbia, Canada.  It is a member of the Nuu-chah-nulth Tribal Council.

See also
Nuu-chah-nulth
Nuu-chah-nulth language

External links
Nuu-chah-nulth Tribal Council homepage
Nuchatlaht Tribe

Nuu-chah-nulth governments
Nootka Sound region